Mimosybra discreta is a species of beetle in the family Cerambycidae. It was described by Pascoe in 1865.

References

Mimosybra
Beetles described in 1865